The 1940 Victorian Football Association season was the 62nd season of the Australian rules football competition. The premiership was won by the Port Melbourne Football Club, which defeated Prahran by 47 points in the Grand Final on 5 October. It was Port Melbourne's first VFA premiership since 1922, and its fourth overall.

Premiership 
World War II had commenced in Europe in September 1939, and the Association opted to proceed with a full premiership season. The home-and-home season was played over twenty matches, before the top four clubs contested a finals series under the Page–McIntyre system to determine the premiers for the season.

Ladder

Finals

Awards 
 Ted Freyer (Port Melbourne) was the leading goalkicker for the season, kicking 133 goals in the home-and-home season and 157 goals overall.
 This season, the Recorder Cup and the Association Medal, which had been parallel best and fairest awards for the Association since 1933, were merged into a single award; both trophies still existed, but they were both awarded to the same winner based on the voting system which had previously been used for the Association Medal. Brighton captain-coach Jack Davis, in his sixteenth and final season of senior football, was the winner for 1940, polling 38½ votes. Lance Collins (Coburg) was second with 34 votes, and Alby Morrison (Preston) was third with 31 votes.
 Coburg won the seconds premiership for the fourth consecutive season. Coburg 14.16 (100) defeated Brunswick 15.5 (95) in the Grand Final, played as a curtain raiser to the seniors Grand Final on Saturday 5 October at the Melbourne Cricket Ground.

Notable events 
 Association clubs continued to aggressively recruit star players from the Victorian Football League, with the agreement between the two competitions relating to player transfers having ended in 1938. In one of the Association's highest profile recruiting coups of all time, Williamstown recruited 's Ron Todd, who had won the League goalkicking in both 1938 and 1939 and was thought to be one of the best full forwards that the League had ever seen. With Todd in the team, Williamstown's membership increased from less than 1,000 to around 2,500, and ground record crowds saw Todd play at Yarraville Oval (for Todd's first Association game) and at Preston.
 Following Brunswick's six-point victory against Northcote on 8 June, Northcote protested the result on the basis that the timekeepers had rung the bell to end the third quarter ten minutes early. The match was declared void, and in the replay on 20 July, Brunswick 16.13 (109) defeated Northcote 14.16 (100) by nine points.
 In the final round of home-and-home matches, Prahran 2.10 (22) trailed Brighton 11.8 (74) by 52 points at three-quarter time; then, with the aid of a strong wind, kicked ten goals to one in the final quarter to win 12.16 (88) to 12.9 (81). As of 2022, it remains the largest three-quarter time deficit overcome for victory in VFA/VFL history, and the come-from-behind win saw Prahran stay ahead of Brunswick and in the final four.

External links 
 List of VFA/VFL Premiers

References 

Victorian Football League seasons
VFL